Lalaji Memorial Omega International School is a co-educational International day and boarding school situated on in Chennai, India, with more than 5000 students. The foundation stone of the school building was laid in 2005 by its promoter, Sri Parthasarathi Rajagopalachari,one of the respected saints from Tamilnadu.

History

Lalaji Memorial Omega International School was started in 2005 in Kolapakkam,Chennai.

S.Bhavani Shankar is the current principal of school.

Education system
The school follows the Central Board of Secondary Education system. The school with a capacity of more than 5000 students offers curriculum in National and International Syllabus.

It was rated as the one of the top ten schools in India in year 2019, in the International Day cum Boarding school category as per the rankings of Education World.

One of the students of the school,Kaustav Mehta, was named in the merit list of global science video contest. The school also organises co-curricular activities in various streams.

Initiatives

 The school had adopted Government High school,Kolapakkam.

 The school follows natural methods like Organic farming and Solar Power.

Sports

 The school has its cricket ground with state of the art facilities. For Coaching in Cricket the school has tied up with the training centre operated by leading Indian cricketer R.Ashwin.

 In 2020, world famous badminton shuttler PV Sindhu opened her Badminton court and training centre.

 School organises domestic cricket tournaments for different age categories of boys.

Related Articles

 Education in India.

References

External links 
 Official Website

High schools and secondary schools in Tamil Nadu
Schools in Chennai
2005 establishments in Tamil Nadu